Anders Christian Gogstad (17 November 1923 – 30 June 2010) was a Norwegian professor of medicine.

After the cand.med. degree he specialized in neurology in 1957, took the dr.med. degree in 1968 and specialized in social medicine in 1976. He was a professor of social medicine at the University of Bergen from 1977 to 1993. He published on health in Norway during World War II.

References

1923 births
2010 deaths
Norwegian neurologists
Academic staff of the University of Bergen
Norwegian public health doctors